Bartłomiej Chwalibogowski (born 7 August 1982) is a Polish professional footballer who plays as a left winger for Zgoda Byczyna.

Career
He joined GKS Bełchatów from Zagłębie Sosnowiec in the winter break of the 2006–07 season. He was one of the best II Liga players in the first part of the 2006–07.

Chwalibogowski previously played for GKS Bełchatów and Zagłębie Sosnowiec in the Polish Ekstraklasa.

References

1982 births
Footballers from Kraków
Living people
Polish footballers
Association football midfielders
Victoria Jaworzno players
Zagłębie Sosnowiec players
GKS Bełchatów players
Odra Wodzisław Śląski players
GKS Katowice players
Szczakowianka Jaworzno players
Ekstraklasa players
I liga players
II liga players
IV liga players